Marinette was a ghost town in Maricopa County, Arizona, located just northwest of Peoria, Arizona, along the Atchison, Topeka and Santa Fe Railway. The site was promoted in the early 20th century for production of citrus fruit, apricots, olives, and other crops. The town was purchased by the Southwest Cotton company, a Goodyear subsidiary, in 1920. It existed until 1957, when the post office serving Marinette was moved to Youngtown. The place where Marinette once was later became the site of Del Webb Corporation's Sun City, Arizona.

References

External links
 Marinette article at Wikimapia, with maps and photos

Former populated places in Maricopa County, Arizona
Ghost towns in Arizona